The Plate Assay Act 1700 (12 & 13 Will 3 c 4) was an Act of the Parliament of England.

The Plate Assay Act 1700 was repealed by section 4(2)(b) of the Assay Offices Act 1962 (10 & 11 Eliz 2 c xvii).

References
Halsbury's Statutes,

External links
Text of the Act

Acts of the Parliament of England
1700 in law
1700 in England